The Men's 1500 metres competition at the 2017 World Single Distances Speed Skating Championships was held on 12 February 2017.

Results
The race was started at 19:04.

References

Men's 1500 metres